Joshua William Brooks, M.A. was born in 1790 and died 15 February 1882: he was a priest in the Church of England.

Family
Joshua William Brooks married Frances Summerscales on 1 January 1829 in Sandal Magna, West Riding of Yorkshire.

Career
Brooks was ordained in 1820, and was successively 
Curate of East Retford, Nottinghamshire 1821 - 1827
Domestic Chaplain to Viscount Galway 1821 - 1827
Vicar of St John the Baptist Church, Clarborough and St Saviour's Church Retford Nottinghamshire 1827 - 1843
Rector of St. Helen's Church, Grove 1837 - 1843
Domestic Chaplain to William Vesey-FitzGerald, 2nd Baron FitzGerald and Vesey c. 1840
Vicar of St. Mary's Church, Nottingham 1843 - 1864
Prebendary of Lincoln 1858 - ca. 1882
Rector of Great Ponton, 1864 - 1882

At St. Mary's he led a campaign to open new churches in Nottingham which resulted in:

St. Matthew's Church, Talbot Street 1856
St. Mark's Church, Nottingham 1856 
St. Luke's Church, Nottingham 1863
St. Ann's Church, Nottingham 1864
St Saviours in the Meadows, Nottingham 1864
All Saints' Church, Nottingham, 1864

Publications
The Investigator, (editor), 1831-1836
A Dictionary of Writers on the Prophecies
Abdiel's Essays on the Advent and Kingdom of Christ, 1834
Elements of Prophetical Interpretation, 1836

References
Bowen, M. W. (1997) The Anglican Church in the Industrialised Town, St. Mary's Parish, Nottingham 1770-1884 (M. W. Bowen, MA, M Phil, University of Nottingham, October 1997)

1790 births
1882 deaths
19th-century English Anglican priests
Vicars of St Mary's Church, Nottingham